Pointe Pescarde is located in Tipaza, Algeria.

References

Geography of Algeria
Geography of Tipaza Province